Delta Dreamland is the fourth album by Deborah Allen and released by Giant Records. This 1993 album marked the return of Allen as a singer as her last album was released in 1987. Lead single "Rock Me (In the Cradle of Love)" charted on Hot Country Songs.

Track listing

Track information and credits taken from the album's liner notes.

Personnel
Deborah Allen - lead vocals, synthesizer
Bill Cuomo - keyboards, organ, synthesizers, strings
Billy Burnette - electric guitar
Brent Mason - electric guitar
Dan Dugmore - steel guitar
Dann Huff - electric guitar
Glenn Worf - bass
Lonnie Wilson - drums, cymbals, percussion, vocals
Mike Henderson - dobro
Rafe Van Hoy - electric guitar, acoustic guitar, bass, drums, keyboards, vocals
Steve Nathan - keyboards
Tommy Spurlock - steel guitar
Vicki Hampton - vocals
Weldon Myrick  - steel guitar

Production
Produced by Deborah Allen and Rafe Van Hoy
Engineers: Mike Bradley, Jon "JD" Dickson, Marshall Morgan, Toby Seay, Rafe Van Hoy
Mixing: Marshall Morgan
Editing: Don Cobb
Mastering: Denny Purcell

Chart performance

References

External links
Deborah Allen Official Site
Giant Records Official Site

1993 albums
Deborah Allen albums
Giant Records (Warner) albums